Central Highlands may refer to:
Central Highlands (Central America)
Massif Central of France
Highlands of Iceland
Central Highland (Japan)
Central Highlands (Madagascar)
Cameron Highlands of Malaysia
Central Highlands of Scotland, also known as the Grampians
Central Highlands of Sri Lanka
Central Highlands (Vietnam)

Australia
Central Highlands Region, Queensland, local government area
Central Highlands (Tasmania), Australia
Central Highlands Council, local government area
Central Highlands (Victoria), Australia
Central Highlands Province, state electorate